Pageland Airport  is a public use airport located three nautical miles (5 km) southeast of the central business district of Pageland, a city in Chesterfield County, South Carolina, United States. It is owned by the Town of Pageland.

Facilities and aircraft 
It has two runways: 6/24 is 3,396 by 60 feet (1,035 x 18 m) with an asphalt surface.

For the 12-month period ending December 15, 2015, the airport had 48,300 aircraft operations, an average of 132 per day: 100% general aviation. At that time there were 12 aircraft based at this airport: 11 single-engine and 1 multi-engine.

References

External links 
 Pageland Airport (PYG) airport data from South Carolina Division of Aeronautics
 IFR aircraft movements from South Carolina Division of Aeronautics
 

Airports in South Carolina
Buildings and structures in Chesterfield County, South Carolina
Transportation in Chesterfield County, South Carolina